(13 February 1848 – 30 July 1918) was a Prussian officer, later  during World War I. He was a recipient of  with Oak Leaves, one of the highest orders of merit in the Kingdom of Prussia and, subsequently, Imperial Germany.

Biography
His father  (1813-1892) was a  politician. Both of his grandfathers were notable politicians.
He joined the Prussian Army in 1866, and took part in the Austro-Prussian War of 1866, and in the Franco-Prussian War of 1870-1871. He won the Iron Cross second class during the Franco-Prussian War. In 1912 he took command of the 7th Army Inspection, the peacetime headquarters for the Imperial German XVI, XVIII, and XXI Army Corps.

At the outbreak of World War I,  was incapacitated in consequence of an accident in May 1914, but was able to play a part in the Battle of Soissons in 1915. He became the commanding general of the 10th Army on 21 January 1915, and commanded it until 5 March 1918. This Army engaged in the great battle of the  Masurian Lakes in East Prussia in February 1915. In August, he took Kovno and afterwards the fortresses of Grodno and Olita, and continued his advance into  Russia. On 30 July 1916, while remaining in command of the 10th Army,  became supreme commander of Army Group Eichhorn based around 10th Army, which he would command until 31 March 1918. On 3 April 1918, Field Marshal  became supreme commander of Army Group Kyiv (Heeresgruppe Kiew) and simultaneously military governor of Ukraine.

Death 
Eichhorn was assassinated in Kyiv by a member of the Russian Party of Left Socialist-Revolutionaries, Boris Donskoy, threw a bomb at the carriage carrying Field Marshal.

Awards 
  Order of Saint Stanislaus, 3rd Class (31 August 1871)
  Prussian Order of the Crown, 1st Class (17 January 1904)
  Order of Philip the Magnanimous, Grand Cross with Crown (8 September 1905)
  Order of the Red Eagle, Grand Cross with Oak Leaves (20 August 1907)
  Ludwig Order, Grand Cross (15 September 1912)
  (18 August 1915), with Oak Leaves (28 September 1915)
  Military Order of St. Henry, Commander 2nd Class (25 October 1916)

He was also awarded an honorary doctorate from the University of Berlin on 18 February 1918.

Wilhelm II, German Emperor, decreed that one of the eight towers of Malbork Castle ( of the Teutonic Order) should be named after him.  in the Marzahn-Hellersdorf district of Berlin was named after him during his lifetime.

Notes

External links
 Photo of Eichhorn and his adjutant
 

1848 births
1918 deaths
Military personnel from Wrocław
People from the Province of Silesia
Field marshals of the German Empire
Field marshals of Prussia
German military personnel of the Franco-Prussian War
German military personnel killed in World War I
Assassinated German people
Assassinated military personnel
German people murdered abroad
People murdered in Ukraine
Burials at the Invalids' Cemetery
Recipients of the Pour le Mérite (military class)
Recipients of the Order of Saint Stanislaus (Russian), 3rd class
German Army generals of World War I